Teplý Vrch is a village and municipality in the Rimavská Sobota District of the Banská Bystrica Region of southern Slovakia.

Tourism
It is known for the warmest geothermal lake in Slovakia (27 °C, 80 F). A hotel, camping site and several accommodation facilities are at disposal in the village. It is a popular summer resort in Banská Bystrica Region. In the village is located menagerie.

References

External links
 
 
Touristic information

Villages and municipalities in Rimavská Sobota District